Alessandria may refer to three towns in Italy, and to various things related to them
Alessandria, a town in Piedmont
U.S. Alessandria Calcio 1912, Alessandria's football club
Roman Catholic Diocese of Alessandria della Paglia, the Roman Catholic diocese centred on Alessandria
The Province of Alessandria, the Italian province with Alessandria as its capital
Alessandria del Carretto, a town in the province of Cosenza in Calabria
Alessandria della Rocca, a small agricultural town in Sicily
Alessandria (meteorite), a meteorite which fell in 1860 near Alessandria, Piedmont, Italy

People with the surname
Arnaud Alessandria (born 1993), Monegasque alpine skier
Lucas Alessandría (born 1978), Argentine footballer

See also
Alexandria (disambiguation)
Kandahar (disambiguation)
Sikandarabad (disambiguation)